The European Society for Phenylketonuria and Allied Disorders Treated as Phenylketonuria (E.S.PKU) is a Europe-based non-profit organization. It was founded in 1987 by patient-driven associations to help improve the treatment of phenylketonuria (PKU) in Europe.

Organization 
The E.S.PKU has 41 member organizations from across Europe. One of the later countries to join was the French association Les Feux Follets in 2013. A member organization has to be a non-profit organization on a national level dealing with phenylketonuria patients. The E.S.PKU executive board is elected by the annual general meeting every three years and consists of volunteers. The Scientific advisory committee oversees projects like the European Guidelines and collects data to support studies in the field of phenylketonuria.

Besides the political work (such as METAB-ERN or EXCEMED) on European level, the E.S.PKU hosts an annual conference.

Projects

Benchmark report 
The E.S.PKU benchmark report assesses the differences in care across Europe and provides a starting point for the E.S.PKU to improve any gaps in care that have been identified. In consequence, the delegates decided that action is required to improve this situation. The report was presented at the European Parliament. To underline this effort, the consensus paper was written.

Consensus paper 
In 2013 the E.S.PKU delegates launched a paper describing the needs for a better and equal treatment across Europe. This paper subsequently lead to the first European Guidelines for Phenylketonuria.

European guidelines for phenylketonuria 
The consensus paper was picked up by the Scientific Advisory Committee of the E.S.PKU. The SAC launched an expert group, the creation the first European Guidelines for Phenylketonuria. This led to the first publication of the key statements in the lancet diabetes and endocrinology. By the end of the year, the complete guidelines were published in the Orphanet Journal of Rare Diseases. The publication also received some critical attention from other medical professionals. A second version of the guidelines is already been worked on.

International PKU Day 
The International PKU Day was launched in 2013 and is taking place on June 28 every year. It was inspired by the Rare Disease Day and should increase the awareness for Phenylketonuria to get featured in news. This date was chosen because of the birthdays of both Robert Guthrie (born June 28, 1916) and Horst Bickel (born 28 June 1918). As both of these people had a tremendous impact on the dietary treatment for Phenylketonuria the date proved to be the best option. In subsequence, the Robert Guthrie Memorial site was launched.

Documentations / films 
To highlights certain aspects of the Phenylketonuria treatment and to raise public awareness, the E.S.PKU produces films / documentations.

Annual conference 
Every year, the E.S.PKU and a member country host a conference. The conference takes place in a different country every year and typically has 450-550 participants. The conference takes place at the end of the year and starts on a Thursday, ending on Sunday. There are three separate conference tracks for patients and families, professionals and delegates. The last conference took place in November and was located in Venice, Italy and got some media attention.

References 

Organizations established in 1987
1987 establishments in Belgium
Health advocacy groups
International medical and health organizations
Medical and health organisations based in Belgium